Carl Fredrik Kolderup (6 December 18691 November 1942) was a Norwegian geologist. He was a professor at the University of Bergen and curator at Bergen Museum.

Biography
He was born in Bergen, Norway. He was as a son of tailor Niels Chrispinus Kolderup and Rasmine Margrethe Olsen. He was the father of geologist and politician Niels-Henrik Kolderup.

He studied under W. C. Brøgger (1851-1940)  at the Royal Frederik  University (now University of Oslo) earning a Master's degree in geology in 1892. He earned a dr.philos.from the University of Bergen  in 1908.
From 1898 he was a research fellow at the Bergen Museum and was also museum director from 1914 to 1938.
He became a lecturer in 1904 and from 1914 was a professor at the University of Bergen.

Kolderup did pioneering works on the geology of Western Norway, and he founded the department of mineralogy and geology at Bergen Museum. He was also engaged in organizational work and politics, serving  on the Bergen city council and acting as the city's deputy mayor.

References

1869 births
1942 deaths
Scientists from Bergen
19th-century Norwegian geologists
20th-century Norwegian geologists
Politicians from Bergen
University of Oslo alumni
Academic staff of the University of Bergen
Curators from Bergen